Achille Emaná Edzimbi (born 5 June 1982), known as Emaná, is a Cameroonian professional footballer who plays as an attacking midfielder.

He spent most of his professional career with Toulouse in France and Betis in Spain, playing his later years in Arab countries, Mexico, Japan and India, as well as two spells at Gimnàstic.

Emaná appeared 42 times for Cameroon, representing the country in the 2010 World Cup and three African Cup of Nations tournaments.

Club career

Toulouse
Emaná was born in Yaoundé. After a brief youth spell in Spain with Valencia CF, he moved in 2000 to France and joined Toulouse FC. The following year, at only 19, he became an important first team unit for the Ligue 2 club, never playing in less than 32 games in his first four seasons and helping the Haute-Garonne team to achieve promotion to Ligue 1 in his second year.

In 2005, following Michael Essien's departure to Chelsea, Emaná reportedly attracted interest from French giants Olympique Lyonnais who were looking to replace the Ghanaian, with fellow ligue side Olympique de Marseille also joining the race. The player stayed nonetheless at Toulouse, scoring eight times in 36 matches as the club finished a best-ever third in the first division, thus achieving UEFA Champions League qualification honours.

Emaná was strongly linked with Premier League club Portsmouth in the following off-season, where he would have joined a large contingent of African players. His chances of a move were quashed, however, when he was unable to obtain a work permit, and he subsequently signed a new two-year contract with Toulouse until 2010.

In spring 2008, it was reported that England's West Ham United and Newcastle United were interested in acquiring Emaná's services, with La Liga side Sevilla FC also said to be tracking him. Eventually, nothing came of it again, and he saw out the entire season with the French, who finished in 17th position, being the first team placed outside the relegation zone.

Betis
On 11 June 2008, it was reported that Real Betis were negotiating with Toulouse for Emaná's transfer. The player was quoted as being keen to secure a move to Spain to further his career, even though his current club had apparently already rejected two bids for his signature. On 22 July, he finally completed his move to the Andalusians for a fee of £5.5 million.

Emaná scored his first goal for Betis on 19 October 2008, in a 3–0 home win over RCD Mallorca. In mid-April 2009, he added braces against Racing de Santander (3–2 away win) and Sporting de Gijón (2–0 at home), finishing his first season with 11 goals – squad-best – and seven assists, but his team were relegated in the last matchday.

In spite of heavy speculation about his future, Emaná continued to be an essential unit in the following Segunda División seasons. The attacking trio of himself and strikers Rubén Castro and Jorge Molina combined for more than 50 league goals in 2010–11, as the club returned to the top division after two years of absence.

Later years
On 11 August 2011, Emaná moved to Saudi Arabian club Al Hilal SFC in a deal worth US$6 million. In January of the following year he was loaned to United Arab Emirates' Shabab Al Ahli Club until June, and the move was made permanent on 27 July.

On 22 January 2013, Emaná was loaned to fellow league team Al-Wasl F.C. until the end of the season, mainly as a replacement to long-term injured Mariano Donda. On 27 August, after his loan expired, he agreed to a permanent deal with Cruz Azul from Mexico.

Emaná signed with Atlante F.C. on 17 December 2014 on loan until June, after being transfer listed by his parent club back in June. On 24 July 2015, already as a free agent, he joined Gimnàstic de Tarragona initially on trial, and subsequently penned a one-year contract.

On 20 July 2016, Emaná switched teams and countries again, joining Tokushima Vortis. After making no appearances for the J2 League side, he returned to Nàstic on 12 December.

In August 2017, the 35-year-old Emaná signed with Indian Super League club Mumbai City FC for the 2017–18 season. In October 2018, he returned to Spain and joined CD Gerena of the Tercera División, and the following January moved to Segunda División B with CF Badalona; after no matches for either team, mainly due to bureaucratic problems, he joined UD San Sebastián de los Reyes of the latter competition in August, leaving on 21 January 2020.

Emaná joined Real Jaén in summer 2020.

International career
An international since 2003, Emaná represented the Cameroon national team at that year's FIFA Confederations Cup, also appearing for the country in the 2006 Africa Cup of Nations, where his side exited in the quarter-finals.

Late in 2007, frustrated with the treatment he received whilst at the service of the national team, he retired from international play, but returned shortly after, appearing in the 2008 edition of the Africa Cup of Nations, where he scored against Zambia in a 5–1 group stage win; the side eventually lost the final to Egypt.

Emaná represented Cameroon at the 2010 FIFA World Cup in South Africa, playing two games (two defeats) in an eventual group stage exit for the Lions Indomptables. In exactly ten years of international play, he won 42 caps and scored six goals.

Personal life
Emaná's younger brother, Stephane, was also a footballer. A forward, he too had spells at Betis (youth only) and Gimnàstic.

Honours
Toulouse
Ligue 2: 2002–03

Betis
Segunda División: 2010–11

Al Ahli
UAE League Cup: 2011–12

Cruz Azul
CONCACAF Champions League: 2013–14

Cameroon
Africa Cup of Nations runner-up: 2008
FIFA Confederations Cup runner-up: 2003

References

External links

1982 births
Living people
Footballers from Yaoundé
Cameroonian footballers
Association football midfielders
Ligue 1 players
Ligue 2 players
Toulouse FC players
La Liga players
Segunda División players
Segunda División B players
Real Betis players
Gimnàstic de Tarragona footballers
CD Gerena players
CF Badalona players
UD San Sebastián de los Reyes players
Real Jaén footballers
Saudi Professional League players
Al Hilal SFC players
UAE Pro League players
Al Ahli Club (Dubai) players
Al-Wasl F.C. players
Liga MX players
Cruz Azul footballers
Atlante F.C. footballers
Tokushima Vortis players
Indian Super League players
Mumbai City FC players
Cameroon international footballers
2003 FIFA Confederations Cup players
2006 Africa Cup of Nations players
2008 Africa Cup of Nations players
2010 Africa Cup of Nations players
2010 FIFA World Cup players
Cameroonian expatriate footballers
Expatriate footballers in France
Expatriate footballers in Spain
Expatriate footballers in Saudi Arabia
Expatriate footballers in the United Arab Emirates
Expatriate footballers in Mexico
Expatriate footballers in Japan
Expatriate footballers in India
Cameroonian expatriate sportspeople in France
Cameroonian expatriate sportspeople in Spain
Cameroonian expatriate sportspeople in Saudi Arabia
Cameroonian expatriate sportspeople in the United Arab Emirates
Cameroonian expatriate sportspeople in Mexico
Cameroonian expatriate sportspeople in Japan
Cameroonian expatriate sportspeople in India